Hipperholme Grammar School is a private grammar school in Hipperholme (near Halifax), West Yorkshire, England. It educates pupils between the ages of 3 and 16.

Lightcliffe Preparatory School merged with Hipperholme Grammar School in 2003, under the Hipperholme Grammar Schools Foundation, and was subsequently renamed as Hipperholme Grammar Junior School.

The school has it origins in 1529 within the chantry chapel of the nearby village of Coley. In 1648 (the date the school classes as its founding year) Matthew Broadley, paymaster to Charles I, endowed a large sum of money to build a school on land donated by Samuel Sunderland of Coley Hall; the school opened its doors on its current site in 1661. Two of the current school houses, Broadley and Sunderland, are named after the founders.

In 1783 a new school hall was constructed, designed by Longbottom. Originally an all-boys school, it became private (ISA, AGBIS) in the 1980s and began admitting girls at the same time.

Notable former pupils

 Richard Alexander, TV presenter and producer
 Sir Gordon Duff, Principal since 2014 of St Hilda's College, Oxford, and Chairman from 201314 of the MHRA
 George Stanley Faber, theologian
   David Halliwell, 19362006 Playwright and dramatist, 'Little Malcolm and his Struggle against the Eunuchs'
 Lawrence Heyworth, radical MP and merchant
 Neil Hopkinson, classical scholar
  John Dyson Hutchinson, Liberal MP from 1877–82
 Courtney Kenny, liberal politician
 Wilf Lunn, prop maker
 Danny McNamara, singer
 Richard McNamara, guitarist
 Katie Ormerod, snowboarder
 Sir Robert Peel, Victorian era Prime Minister and creator of the Metropolitan police
 Percy Sladen, biologist
 Laurence Sterne, Anglo-Irish novelist 
 Sir Donald Thompson, Conservative MP from 197983 for Sowerby and 1983-97 for Calder Valley
 Paddy Tipping, Nottinghamshire PCC since 2012, and Labour MP from 19912012 for Sherwood

References

External links 

ISIS North

Private schools in Calderdale
Educational institutions established in the 1640s
1648 establishments in England